Rio Alamar or Arroyo de Alamar is a river mainly in northern Baja California, Mexico with a small portion in California, United States. The stream is formed by the confluence of Cottonwood Creek and Tecate Creek a short distance north of the Mexico–United States border. It flows generally west for about  through the San Ysidro Mountains and the Tijuana urban area before joining with the Arroyo de las Palmas in central Tijuana, to form the Tijuana River.

See also
List of rivers of Mexico

Rivers of Baja California
Rivers of San Diego County, California